The Borovkov-Florov D  was an experimental fighter aircraft designed in the USSR from 1940.

Development 
The 'D' was designed as a mixed power fighter with a piston engine and Merkulin ramjet booster operating in the same duct. A  Shvetsov M-71 engine was intended to be the main powerplant but it is unclear how the thermodynamic cycles of the two engines were to be linked. Similar aircraft were built later in the German-Soviet War using the main engine to drive a propeller and a compressor to supply air to a ramjet/afterburner booster, both the Su-5 and MiG-13 were produced in limited numbers but the performance gains were limited and soon eclipsed by turbo-jet engines.
A heavy armament of two  Nudelman-Suranov NS-37 cannon and two  ShVAK cannon  was included, but all work was abandoned with the German invasion of 1941.

Specifications

See also

 https://i.pinimg.com/originals/1c/10/3d/1c103d18ee2646bfe3f6dd26f5c9b3b5.jpg

References

 Gunston, Bill. “The Osprey Encyclopaedia of Russian Aircraft 1875 – 1995”. London, Osprey. 1995. 
 Taylor, Michael J.H. . “ Jane's Encyclopedia of Aviation. Studio Editions. London. 1989.  

1940s Soviet fighter aircraft